Harry Edward Grant (born 31 December 1993) is an English footballer who plays for Ascot United as a midfielder.

Playing career
Grant is a central midfielder. He played youth football for Swindon Town where he was captain of their youth team. Dave Jones signed Grant for Sheffield Wednesday in June 2012 on a two-year professional contract. Grant played central midfield for Sheffield Wednesday Development Squad in the U21 Development League scoring 13 goals in 24 games in the 2012–13 season. In March 2013, he joined Gillingham on loan and made his début for the club on 27 April 2013, playing 70 minutes against Burton Albion at the Pirelli Stadium, in what was their title winning season.

After a brief stint at Gillingham, where he featured in 5 games, he joined Maidenhead United on loan where he made an impressive start, by scoring the winning goal to advance them to the fourth round of the 2013–14 FA Trophy. On 26 December 2013, he scored two goals for Maidenhead in a 3–1 win against Staines Town. Grant ended his loan spell with a return of twelve goals in 37 appearances helping the Magpies avoid relegation.

Grant joined Bromley for the season 2014–15. However, after 21 games, Grant moved onto Farnborough on a loan deal until the end of the season. Grant ended his loan spell with a return of 10 goals in 32 appearances. He went on to play for Hayes & Yeading United and Chippenham Town.

In 2018, Grant won the 2017-18 FA Vase with Thatcham Town at Wembley Stadium.

Honours
Gillingham
Football League Two: 2012–13

Bromley
National League South: 2014–15 Football Conference

Thatcham
2017-18 FA Vase
2017–18 Hellenic Football League

References

External links

1993 births
Living people
Sportspeople from Reading, Berkshire
English footballers
Association football midfielders
Reading F.C. players
Swindon Town F.C. players
Sheffield Wednesday F.C. players
Gillingham F.C. players
Maidenhead United F.C. players
Bromley F.C. players
Farnborough F.C. players
Hayes & Yeading United F.C. players
Beaconsfield Town F.C. players
Chippenham Town F.C. players
Hungerford Town F.C. players
Reading City F.C. players
North Leigh F.C. players
English Football League players
National League (English football) players
Isthmian League players
Footballers from Berkshire